Vai que é Mole is a 1960 Brazilian film directed by J. B. Tanko and starring Grande Otelo, Ankito and Jô Soares.

Plot
In this film, Grande Otelo, Ankito and Jô Soares are three thieves frequently searched by the police. Grande Otelo's character was having a crisis with his girlfriend due to his criminal lifestyle. However, things get even more complicated when Grande Otelo receives a letter from his aunt saying that she has sent her son. Grand Otelo's nephew, Zé Maria, is extremely Christian, and eventually wins over Grande Otelo, a fact that causes more problems than anticipated.

External links

1960 films
1960s Portuguese-language films
1960 drama films
Brazilian drama films